The 2017 Waterford Senior Football Championship was the 130th edition of the Waterford GAA's premier club Gaelic football tournament for senior graded clubs in County Waterford, Ireland.

The tournament consists of 12 teams, with the winners representing Waterford in the Munster Senior Club Football Championship. The championship starts with a seeded group stage and then progresses to a knock out stage.

The Nire/Fourmilewater were the defending champions after they defeated Abbeyside/Ballinacourty in the 2016 final.

This was Portlaw's return to the senior grade.

Ballinameela were relegated to the 2018 I.F.C. after just two seasons as a senior club.

Team changes 

The following teams have changed division since the 2016 championship season.

To S.F.C. 
Promoted from 2016 Waterford Intermediate Football Championship
 Portlaw – (Intermediate Champions)

From S.F.C. 
Relegated to 2017 Waterford Intermediate Football Championship
 Saint Saviours

Rounds 1 to 4

Round 1 
All 12 teams enter the championship at this stage. The 6 winners enter the draw for Round 2A while the 6 losers enter Round 2B.

Round 2

Round 2A

Round 2B

Round 3

Round 4

Round 5

Round 6

Knockout stage

Semi-finals

Final

Relegation Playoff

Relegation Semi-Final

Relegation Final

Munster Senior Club Football Championship

References 

Waterford Senior Football Championship
Waterford Senior Football Championship